Férias Frustradas do Pica-Pau (Woody Woodpecker's Frustrated Vacations) is a platform video game developed and published by Tectoy for the Mega Drive, and the Master System, it was released in October 1995 for Brazil only. This video game was based on the animated short film series created by Walter Lantz, and the title and some of the game art makes references to the Brazilian release of National Lampoon's Vacation under the name Frustrated Vacations.

Gameplay
The player takes the role of Woody Woodpecker. Woody's attack is using his beak to attack at enemies. One can also jump to cross platforms or to avoid enemy attacks such as throwing acorns. Also the player would have to collect money bags which are across the levels. Aiding Woody Woodpecker is a rocket pack which makes the player travel faster and a horn to wake Wally Walrus, however these only appear in the Mega Drive version.

Story

At the start of the game, Woody Woodpecker and his friends are travelling down in a car towards their vacation spot. When Woody takes a photo of his friends, a flash suddenly makes them disappear. A letter falls. It reads that Buzz Buzzard (known as Zeca Urubu in Portuguese) has kidnapped Woody's friends and the first to go is Andy Panda. Woody has to save them. Oswald Rabbit is one of the characters that must be saved.

References

External links

1995 video games
Brazil-exclusive video games
Master System games
Sega Genesis games
Video games based on Woody Woodpecker
Video games developed in Brazil
Oswald the Lucky Rabbit
Works about vacationing
Single-player video games